Gezawa is a Local Government Area in Kano State, Nigeria. Its headquarters are in the town of Gezawa. It has an area of 340 km and a population of 282,069 at the 2006 census.

The postal code of the area is 702.

References

Local Government Areas in Kano State